Anthene rothschildi is a butterfly in the family Lycaenidae. It is found in Ethiopia and possibly Kenya.

References

Butterflies described in 1922
Anthene